Rádio e Televisão de Portugal (RTP) is the public service broadcasting organisation of Portugal. It operates four national television channels and three national radio stations, as well as several satellite and cable offerings.

The current company dates from 2007, with the merger of two previously separate companies Radiodifusão Portuguesa (RDP; the radio broadcaster) and Radiotelevisão Portuguesa (television broadcaster), although they had been grouped under a single holding company and common branding since 2004.

RTP is funded by the taxa de contribuição audiovisual (broadcasting contribution tax), which is incorporated in electricity bills, and television advertising revenues.

History

Radio
The Emissora Nacional de Radiodifusão - usually referred to by its abbreviated designation Emissora Nacional (EN) - was established on 4 August 1935 as the public national radio broadcaster, inheriting the previous broadcasting operations of the Portuguese postal service (CTT) . Five years later, EN became independent of the CTT.

Emissora Nacional was one of the 23 founding broadcasting organisations of the European Broadcasting Union in 1950. Following the Carnation Revolution, EN was reorganised and in 1976 changed its name to Radiodifusão Portuguesa (RDP). During this process, several previously private radio stations – such as Rádio Clube Português (RCP) – were nationalised and integrated into RDP.

In 1979, the RCP network was rebranded as Rádio Comercial, and was later privatised in 1993. At the same time, RDP launched the youth-oriented radio station Antena 3 and abolished advertising from all of its stations, so that the aforementioned broadcasting contribution tax became its sole source of funding.

Television

In 1953, a group on behalf of Emissora Nacional de Radiodifusão (later RDP) was set up examining the feasibility of a television service in Portugal. The group started a preliminary work for a network of television signals, with a budget on the order of 500,000 escudos. A foreign company had a proposal for the setup of the television network, including the possibility by a foreign company, with high foreign capital, tasking up a proposal for the building of the network and having the exclusive rights of the selling of television sets in the country for a determined period of time In July 1954, their report A Televisão em Portugal (Television in Portugal) was published and was built upon the following pillars:
1. The current status of TV and the opportunity for its introduction in Portugal
2. The operating system to be adopted
3. The solution that seems possible
4. Outline of an initial plan and related charges
5. Economic study
6. List of work already carried out by ENR.

Without suspending the activity of the Television Studies Group (while entering a new phase of activity, evolving naturally on the data set gathered), it was nevertheless necessary to wait 6 months for a decisive impulse given to the preliminary work for the installation of the national TV network: a Commission, appointed by Order, was responsible for coordinating and commenting on the studies carried out or to be carried out and defining the scenario in which future broadcasts should take place. This Commission was made up of:
Brigadier Luís de Pina (former military attaché to the embassies in Washington and London), who presided over it;
António Eça de Queirós;
Engineer Manuel Bivar
Dr. Stichini Vilela, for Emissora Nacional;
Major Jorge Botelho Moniz, for the private radio stations;
Engineer Carlos Ribeiro
Dr. Fernando Elói, for the General Administration of Posts, Telegraphs and Telephones.

Radiotelevisão Portuguesa (RTP) was established on 15 December 1955 as the national television service, under Article 1 of Decree nº 40 341, as a government limited liability company, under the name of RTP - Radiotelevisão Portuguesa, SARL, with the minimum capital provided for by law, in the amount of 60 million escudos, divided into thirds that fell to the State, the private broadcasters and to the public - this part to be subscribed in shares of 1 000 escudos, for which several banking institutions immediately became responsible.

The following radio stations had shares in RTP (values in thousands of escudos):
Rádio Clube Português: 9 260
Rádio Renascença: 4 630
Emissores do Norte Reunidos: 2 310
Rádio Clube de Moçambique: 2 310
Emissores Associados de Lisboa: 1 400
Rádio Ribatejo: 30
Rádio Pólo Norte: 30
Posto Emissor de Radiodifusão do Funchal: 20
Rádio Clube de Angra: 20

Experimental broadcasts began on 4 September 1956 from the Feira Popular (an entertainment park) experimental studios in Lisbon.  Twenty monitors were installed in the park, but crowds gathered in shops around the city. The broadcast was received within a range of about 20 km. Around 1,000 TV sets are sold within a month. The first broadcast was made in association with the O Século newspaper. Intense work was done in the two weeks leading up to the first experimental broadcast.

On December 5, 1956, a contract was signed for the installation of the five transmitters to be built in the first phase of the national television network (dates implied are date of first operation):
Monsanto (December 3, 1956)
Monte da Virgem (December 31, 1957)
Lousã (November 23, 1957)
Monchique (April 25, 1958)
Montejunto (March 10, 1958)

RTP's first yearly report (in 1956) stated that there were difficulties in receiving the terrain to install the television transmitters, a goal RTP wanted to achieve by March 1957.

Regular broadcasting, however, did not start until 7 March 1957, by which time coverage had reached approximately 65% of the Portuguese population. By the end of 1958 the total number of sets in Portugal was around 32,000. 

RTP was accepted as a full active member of the EBU in 1959. 

By the mid-1960s, RTP had become available throughout the country. Robert Farnon's "Derby Day" was extensively used as RTP's fanfare to open the programming since the very first day, and over the decades it has become RTP's official anthem.

25 December 1968 saw the opening of a second television channel, RTP2. Two new regional channels were created in 1972 and 1975, for the Portuguese archipelagos of Madeira (opening on 6 August 1972) and the Azores (10 August 1975).

Before the Carnation Revolution, RTP was essentially a mouthpiece of the regime, and famously opened the newscast of 20 July 1969 – the day of the first moon landing – with a segment showing president Américo Thomaz opening a concrete factory. However, like many other broadcasters, it did broadcast live the landing of the man on the moon during the night.

The first colour broadcast was made in 1975, with the live coverage of the first parliamentary elections after Carnation Revolution. However, due to the political turmoil and the economic situation of the country, the colour regular broadcast was delayed several times for nearly 5 years. During that time, RTP started to purchase some colour equipment and make the occasional colour recording. But the pressure kept going as the black and white equipment was getting old and very hard to repair, so in 1978 and 1979, a massive investment into colour broadcasts, supported by a foreign loan, gave RTP the opportunity to replace all the B/W to increase the current amount of equipment and to be updated with the most advanced broadcast technologies available at the time. Despite this, only in February 1980, the government finally authorised the regular colour broadcast and two weeks after, on 7 March, RTP started the regular colour broadcast, with more than 70% of the programmes being already in colour. Also, RTP moved its headquarters to a brand new building. The building was originally built to be converted to a hotel, but the owner decided to leave it untouched and reached an agreement with RTP for the purchase and converted the interior for office use. RTP moved to more adequate headquarters and sold the building in 2003 and the new owner converted into what is today the VIP Grand Lisboa.

Until 1991, RTP owned its transmitter network, which was transferred to a state-owned enterprise which, through a series of mergers, became part of Portugal Telecom. RTP held the television monopoly until 1992, the year when the private SIC (backed by Impresa, TSF, Rádio Comercial, Lusomundo, Expresso, Impala Editores, and the largest commercial TV network in Latin America Rede Globo) started broadcasting. Over the years, RTP's audience share has constantly reduced in favour of the private channels. 2007 was an exception to this tendency, and RTP1 became the second most watched channel in Portugal, only behind TVI, a rarity which occurred again in 2009 and 2010.

In 2004, RTP and RDP were organized under a new company and became part of a larger state-owned holding, named Rádio e Televisão de Portugal, SGPS, and inaugurated the new headquarters near Parque das Nações, in Lisbon. In the same year, the second channel was rebranded as '2:', promoting itself as the civil society service. Later in March 2007, 2: became 'RTP2' again. In February 2007 Radiotelevisão Portuguesa SA (the former RTP) and Radiodifusão Portuguesa SA (RDP) were merged into the new Radio e Televisão de Portugal SA, ceasing to be independent entities.

Due to the financial crisis Portugal faced, RTP was to be heavily restructured as part of the Portuguese government's austerity plan between 2011-15 and would have included the sale of one of the free to air channel licenses. However, due to pressure from the public and other organisations, the planned channel privatization never came into effect, although some restructuring took place, namely the phasing out of the international shortwave radio channels.

RTP has 16 regional offices spread all over the country, as well as international bureaus in Washington D.C., Brussels, Moscow, Brazil and several other locations.

RTP aired the 2008 Olympic Games in HD through the ZON TV Cabo satellite and cable platform. On 30 September 2009, RTP 1 HD returned in an experimental broadcast.

Following Salvador Sobral's win in the Eurovision Song Contest 2017, RTP took on hosting duties for the 2018 contest.

Post-merger
The use of original full names of the radio and television departments (Radiodifusão Portuguesa and Radiotelevisão Portuguesa, respectively) was phased out. The acronym RTP (previously used by the television department) was kept to designate both the whole organization resulting from the merger, as well as to continue to designate its several TV channels. The acronym RDP (previously used by the radio department) was kept to be used by the international radio services (RDP Internacional and RDP África) and by the regional radio centers (RDP Norte, RDP Centro, RDP Lisboa, RDP Sul, RDP Açores and RDP Madeira).

Logo history

Television channels

Former channels
 RTP Mobile, is a channel adapted to mobile devices. It ended in 2011/2012, with the ascension of mobile apps.
 RTP 4K, which was used to broadcast UEFA Euro 2016 and 2018 FIFA World Cup matches in 4K Ultra HD.

Radio stations

National

 Antena 1, news, talk and sports station with a strong focus on Portuguese music;
 Antena 2, cultural programming, classical and world music, featuring live performances;
 Antena 3, an up-tempo, youth-oriented station with focus on contemporary and alternative music;

International
 RDP Internacional, the international radio service;
 RDP África, programming directed towards the Portuguese-speaking African communities;

Digital
 Rádio Lusitania, a digital-only station with a focus on Portuguese music;
 Rádio Vivace, a digital-only station with a focus on Classical music;
 Rádio ZigZag, a digital-only station with a focus on Children's programmes;
 Antena 1 Fado, a digital-only station with a focus on fado;
 Antena 1 Memória, a digital-only station with a focus on rebroadcasts of programmes from the extensive archives of RDP and golden oldies music (in both cases from the 1930s to the 1980s). It is the only station to rely entirely on pre-existing recorded programmes and material;
 Antena 1 Vida, a digital-only station;
 Antena 2 Ópera, a digital-only station with a focus on opera music;
 Antena 2 Jazzin, a digital-only station with a focus on jazz music;

Regional
The following stations are Antena 1 regional stations:
 RDP Norte
 RDP Centro
 RDP Lisboa
 RDP Sul
 RDP Açores
 RDP Madeira

News services

Most RTP1 news programmes are simulcasted with RTP Internacional, RTP África, and, sometimes, RTP 3 television channel. These news programs include:

Bom Dia Portugal (6:30−10 am), live from the Lisbon studios;
Jornal da Tarde (1 pm), live from the Porto studios;
Portugal em Direto (5:30 pm), live from the Lisbon studios;
Telejornal (8 pm), live from the Lisbon studios.

RTP2’s only news service is Jornal 2 (‘Journal 2’ or ‘News 2’ in English) (9:30 pm), a shorter and a more objective newscast than the RTP1 ones.

RTP3 features hourly news updates and headlines.

Organisation

Chairmen of the Board
Almerindo Marques, 2002−2008
Guilherme Costa, 2008−2012
Alberto da Ponte, 2012−2015
Gonçalo Reis, 2015–2020
Nicolau Santos, 2021–present

News Director
José Rodrigues dos Santos, 2001−2004
José Alberto Carvalho, 2004−2011
Nuno Santos, 2011−2012
Paulo Ferreira, 2012–2014
José Manuel Portugal, 2014–2015
Paulo Dentinho, 2015–2018
Maria Flor Pedroso, 2018–2020
António José Teixeira, 2020–present

Programming Directors of RTP1
Nuno Santos, 2002−2007
José Fragoso, 2008−2011, 2018−
Hugo Andrade, 2011–2015
Daniel Deusdado, 2015–2018
José Fragoso, 2018–present

Programming Directors of RTP2
Manuel Falcão, 2003−2006
Jorge Wemans, 2006−2012
Hugo Andrade, 2012–2014
Elíseo Oliveira, 2014–2015
Teresa Paixão, 2015–present

See also 

 List of Portuguese language television channels
 Festival da Canção
 Television in Portugal
 Digital television in Portugal
 Sociedade Independente de Comunicação
 Televisão Independente
 Luis Miguel Loureiro, RTP journalist

Notes

References

External links

 Official Site 
 Live Radio
 
 

 
Portuguese radio networks
Television networks in Portugal
Portuguese-language television networks
Mass media in Portugal
Government-owned companies of Portugal
Publicly funded broadcasters
Entertainment companies established in 1935
1935 establishments in Portugal
Television channels and stations established in 1957
Portuguese news websites